Ricky Young (born 1960) is an American former professional super lightweight boxer from New York City, who had 21 fights with 6 KO's and 17 wins.

Early life 
Born in July 1960 in Savannah, Georgia, U.S., Ricky Young spent most of his early life in a housing project in Harlem. After graduating high school, Young lived with his parents and two younger sisters while working as a carpenter's assistant. Young's father worked as a bookkeeper and his mother worked as a trimmer in a clothing factory.

Career 
Young started his career after deciding to start going to the gym to get in shape. Young quickly started to discover his talent for boxing and began to nurture it. Ricky Young says he was influenced by the success of Sugar Ray Robinson and Muhammad Ali, and used this inspiration to fuel his discipline to train on a daily basis.

Ricky's trainer was Bobby McQuillar, an American former professional lightweight boxer, who had 44 fights with 17 KO's and 38 wins. McQuillar is known for beating three men who went on to hold world titiles, Joe Brown, Jimmy Carter and Sandy Saddler. McQuillar trained Young at Gleason's Gymnasium on West 30th Street and 8th Avenue.

Some of Young's notable fights included a 1986 fight against Buddy McGirt at Madison Square Garden with Mike Tyson on undercard. Young also retired Leroy Haley in 1985 at the Madison Square Garden Felt Forum where Mike Tyson was undercard and co-featured by Iran Barkley. Young also fought Angel Cruz in 1985 at the Madison Square Garden Felt Forum for USA NYS Super Lightweight Title with Iran Barkley on undercard.

After his boxing career, Ricky went on to run the boxing program at Columbia University from 1996 - 2007.

Professional boxing record

References 

1960 births
Living people
Light-welterweight boxers
American male boxers
Boxers from New York (state)
People from Harlem
Columbia University faculty